Francesco "Franco" Battiato (23 March 1945 – 18 May 2021) was an Italian musician, singer, composer, filmmaker and, under the pseudonym Süphan Barzani, also a painter. Battiato's songs contain esoteric, philosophical and religious themes, and have spanned genres such as experimental pop, electronic music, progressive rock, opera, symphonic music, movie soundtrack, oratorio and new wave.

He was for decades one of the most popular singer-songwriters in Italy. His unique sound, song-crafting and especially his lyrics, often containing philosophical, religious, and culturally exotic references, as well as tackling or painting universal themes about the human condition earned him a unique spot on Italy's music scene, and the nickname of "Il Maestro" His work includes songwriting and joint production efforts with several Italian and international musicians and pop singers, including the long-lasting professional relationship with Italian singer Alice. Together with Alice, Battiato represented Italy at the 1984 Eurovision Song Contest with the song "I treni di Tozeur".

Biography

Early years and experimental period
Battiato was born in Ionia, Sicily, Italy. After graduating from high school at the Liceo Scientifico "Archimede" in Acireale, and following the death of his father (truck driver and longshoreman in New York), in 1964 he moved first to Rome, and then to Milan at age 19, and soon after won his first musical contract.

His single, "La Torre", was released and Battiato appeared on TV to perform the song. He scored some success with the romantic song È l'amore. After some works as a guitarist and sound engineer for popular singers, he traveled to America for a small tour where he had considerable success. After that, Battiato met the experimental musician Juri Camisasca in 1970 and collaborated with Osage Tribe, an Italian psychedelic-progressive rock band. As a solo artist, he released the science-fiction single La convenzione (The convention), one of the finest Italian progressive rock songs of the 1970s.

Starting from 1971, Battiato devoted much of his efforts to experimental electronic music, producing a series of LPs that remained almost unknown at the time, but are now eagerly sought by collectors worldwide. Starting out with electronic progressive rock with some emphasis on vocals, his music became increasingly experimental, gradually moving into the realms of musique concrète and minimalism. Fetus, his first album, was produced in January 1972, followed by Pollution (1973), Sulle Corde di Aries (1973), Clic (1974) and M.elle le "Gladiator" (1975).

In 1975, he moved to the Dischi Ricordi label, producing Battiato (1977), Juke Box (1978) and the experimental :it:L'Egitto prima delle sabbie ("Egypt Before the Sands", 1978), which won the Stockhausen award for contemporary music. Battiato's early research about sound represented an important innovation as the basis of the THX and Stereophonic Sound.

National success

After the Ricordi label failed to re-sign him, Battiato signed with EMI. He abandoned the progressive rock experiments of the previous years and moved to a more pop-oriented style which afforded him ever increasing popularity with Italian and worldwide audiences. In this period his albums were usually in collaboration with the renowned musician and violinist Giusto Pio, whose two later albums were produced by Battiato. 

After L'era del cinghiale bianco (The Era of the White Boar, 1979) Patriots was released, and it was his first LP of the 80s.  That album was successful enough to reach the thirtieth position on the charts.  It contains a few songs which have become Battiato's classics, such as "Le Aquile" (The Eagles), and "Prospettiva Nevskij" (Nevsky Prospect).  This new era of his music marks the beginning of his collaboration with the singer Alice and the violinist Giusto Pio.  His following LP was "La Voce del Padrone" (The Master's Voice).  He had even more success with this album than with "Patriots".  His compositions sound both elegant, yet easy to listen to.  This was the key to his growing fan base, of course. "La Voce del Padrone" contains many songs which became classics of Italian music.  It stayed in the number one position for six months, becoming the first Italian LP with more than one million copies sold in only a month. His commercial success was confirmed by L'arca di Noè (Noah's Ark) in 1982. Songs such as "L'era del cinghiale bianco" (1979), "Prospettiva Nevskij" (1980), "Centro di gravità permanente" ("Permanent Gravity Centrepoint", 1981), "Bandiera bianca" ("White Flag", 1981), and "Voglio vederti danzare" ("I Want To See You Dance", 1982) established Battiato in Italy. Orizzonti perduti (Lost Horizons, 1983) was followed by the successful Mondi Lontanissimi (Faraway Worlds, 1985), which featured a solo version of the popular "I treni di Tozeur" ("The Tozeur Trains)", originally a duet with Alice performed at the 1984 Eurovision Song Contest.

1988's Fisiognomica (Physiognomy) sold more than 300,000 copies and it confirmed Battiato's success. The album, considered by Battiato himself his best work for the balance between music and lyrics, contained the hit "Nomadi" ("Nomads"), originally recorded by Alice and written by his old friend Juri Camisasca, who in the meantime had retired to a Benedictine monastery. The album also included the songs "E ti vengo a cercare", which was performed by director/actor Nanni Moretti in his 1989 movie Palombella Rossa, and "Veni l'autunnu" with lyrics entirely in the Sicilian and Arabic languages.  
In 2013 he signed a publishing deal with Roberto Mancinelli and Sony/ATV Music Publishing.

Collaboration with Manlio Sgalambro
In 1994 Battiato began to collaborate with the Sicilian philosopher Manlio Sgalambro, who was to write almost all the lyrics of his following albums. After the tentative L'ombrello e la macchina da cucire of 1995, in 1996 the duo published what is considered their best work so far, L'imboscata, containing the romantic hit "La cura" ("The care"), elected best Italian song of the year. Gommalacca (1998, with an unusual stress on hard rock), Ferro battuto (2000) and Dieci stratagemmi (2004) continued on the same path, with variations mainly set by Battiato's unceasing desire for musical experimentation.

Later acts
In 2003 Battiato released his first feature film, Perduto amor (Lost love), for which he also composed the soundtrack. The movie won the Silver Ribbon for the best debutant director and was screened, out of competition as a Battiato request, with excellent critics in prestigious film festivals like Berlin, Cannes, Venezia, New York among others. His following movie was, Musikanten, an experimental work about Beethoven's last four years of life. The German musician was played by the Chilean director Alejandro Jodorowsky. 
In November 2012, Battiato accepted an offer from newly elected Sicilian regional president Rosario Crocetta to become the regional Minister for Tourism and Culture, announcing he would not receive any salary for his position, but subsequently had to resign after a controversial statement in which he defined Sicily's corrupt political elite as "prostitutes".

Final years
In the 2010s he issued Fleurs 1, Fleurs 3, and Fleurs 2, one after the other, in that specific order. They included covers of songs originally recorded by very famous Italian singers and singers-songwriters, as well as covers of French and English songs, plus three new songs. He went on releasing his music, always on a thin border between pop, rock and electronics, until 2010. He toured with Alice for the whole of 2016, but in 2017 he held his last concert in Catania. He would have continued his work, but he had to give up for health reasons. At the end of 2019, his manager announced his definitive retirement from the scene.

Battiato was vegetarian and was a follower of the ideas of ecumenism and polytheism.

Battiato died on 18 May 2021, at his home in Milo, Catania, surrounded by rumours about a neurodegenerative disease, osteoporosis or cancer. The real cause of death remains as a secret in order to respect Battiato's last request and family petition. 
The following year it was revealed that the artist had been suffering of multiple myeloma for years, 
diagnosed in 2017.

Discography

Singles
 1965: L'amore è partito (Love's gone) – as Francesco Battiato
 1965: E piu ti amo (The more I love you...) – as Francesco Battiato
 1967: La torre / Le reazioni (The tower / The reaction)
 1967: Triste come me / Il mondo va così (Sad like me / The world goes like this)
 1968: È l'amore / Fumo di una sigaretta (It's love / Smoke of a cigarette)
 1969: Bella ragazza / Occhi d'or (Beautiful girl / Golden eyes)
 1969: Sembrava una serata come tante / Gente (It seemed it was an ordinary evening / People)
 1971: Vento caldo / Marciapiede (Warm wind / Pavement) – recorded 1968
 1972: Energia / Una cellula (Energy / A cell)
 1972: La convenzione / Paranoia (The convention / ...)
 1973: Love / Soldier – as Springfield
 1978: Adieu / San Marco – as Astra
 1979: L'era del cinghiale bianco / Luna indiana (The era of the white boar / Indian moon)
 1981: Bandiera bianca / Summer on a Solitary Beach (White flag / ...)
 1984: I treni di Tozeur / Le biciclette di Forlì (The trains of Tozeur / The bicycles of Forlì) – with Alice
 1985: No Time No Space / Il re del mondo (... / The king of the world)
 1985: Via Lattea / L'animale (Milky Way / The animal)
 1996: Strani giorni (Strange days)
 1996: Strani giorni (Remix)
 1997: La cura (The cure)
 1997: Di passaggio (Passing by)
 1998: Shock in My Town
 1998: Il ballo del potere (The Dance of Power)
 2001: Running Against the Grain
 2007: Il vuoto (The emptiness)
 2007: Il vuoto (Stylophonic Remix)
 2008: Tutto l'universo obbedisce all'amore (The entire universe obeys love)
 2009: Inneres Auge
 2012: Passacaglia
 2013: Del suo veloce volo (Of its rapid flight) – with Antony and the Johnsons

Operas 
Genesi (1987)
Gilgamesh (1992)
Messa arcaica (1994)
Il cavaliere dell'intelletto (1994) – unreleased
Telesio (2011)

Filmography 
 Perdutoamor (2003)
 Musikanten (2005)
 Nothing is as it seems (2007)
 La sua figura (2007)
 Auguri Don Gesualdo (2010)
 Attraversando il Bardo (2014)

Bibliography 
 Tecnica mista su tappeto, Conversazioni autobiografiche (1992)
 Evoluzione evoluzione evoluzione (1998)
 Parole e canzoni (2004)
 In fondo sono contento di aver fatto la mia conoscenza (2007)
 Musica e spiritualità (2008)
 Io chi sono? Dialoghi sulla musica e sullo spirito (2009)
 Temporary Road. (una) Vita di Franco Battiato. Dialogo con Giuseppe Pollicelli (2018)

References

External links 
 
Radio BattiatoHispano, the first radio dedicated to Battiato and to his vast collaborations
www.battiatoweb.com BattiatoWeb, unofficial Spanish website
Franco Battiato on Europopmusic.eu 
Franco Battiato discography (Music City)

 

1945 births
2021 deaths
Italian male singer-songwriters
Composers from Sicily
Eurovision Song Contest entrants for Italy
Eurovision Song Contest entrants of 1984
Italian film directors
Italian opera composers
Male opera composers
20th-century Italian male singers
21st-century Italian male singers
Musicians from the Province of Catania
Nastro d'Argento winners
Sicilian-language singers
20th-century Italian composers
Deaths from multiple myeloma